The 1965 New York state election was held on November 2, 1965, to elect a judge of the New York Court of Appeals, as well as all members of the New York State Assembly and the New York State Senate.

Background
Judge Marvin R. Dye would reach the constitutional age limit of 70 years at the end of the year.

In December 1964, the assembly and senate districts were re-apportioned. This time, the legislators were elected for an exceptional one-year term (the session of 1966). From this election on, the assembly districts are all numbered statewide (from 1 to 165, in 1966; from 1 to 150 thereafter) instead of apportioned by county and numbered inside the county (previously 150 districts). This was the only general election of state legislators in an odd-numbered year after 1937.

Result
Former Senator Kenneth Keating was elected.

Notes

Sources
KEATING IS VICTOR IN COURT CONTEST; Ex-Senator Tops McGivern for Appeals Bench in Sole Statewide Election in NYT on November 3, 1965 (subscription required)
Vote totals from New York Red Book 1966

See also
New York state elections
New York City mayoral election, 1965

1965
 
New York